Dictador is a brand of rum from Colombia.

History

The rum is named after Severo Arango y Ferro, nicknamed "El Dictador", who in the 1700s oversaw trade between Spain and the colonies. At the end of the 18th century Severo Arango y Ferro came to Cartagena de Indias in Nueva Granada (today's Colombia). He had plans to improve the tax collection system for Spain in the American Spanish colonies. His strong and powerful nature was quickly recognized and soon became DICTADOR. During his stay at Nueva Grenada he fell in love at first sight (and taste) - he discovered the rum there. His dedication and attachment to a tropical potion led him to become a key supplier of exotic sugarcane spirits, which at the time were the currency of the region.

The company was founded by one of his descendants, Don Julio Arango y Parra, in 1913.

Production

The Dictador distillery is located in Cartagena de Indias on the Caribbean Sea in Colombia. The privileged position almost on the seafront creates a unique microclimate, ideal for rum aging, with an ambient temperature above 25 degrees, relative humidity above 85 percent per year. The proximity of the sea gives a distinctive taste of rum.  

Dictador rum is produced from sugar cane honey as opposed to molasses. In the rum production process, depending on its type, fermentation is subjected to so-called "Honey" - juice obtained from the first pressing of sugar cane. Later - in steel columns or copper alembics - distillation takes place. The distillate obtained in this way goes to oak barrels, in which it is aged. This is where the rum gets its final "cut" shaping its taste and bouquet.

Due to restrictions imposed by the government to protect their own distilleries Dictador rum is not sold in 98% of Colombia. Less than 1% of its total production makes it to the Colombian market.

Product Portfolio

Dictador's product portfolio focuses on aged rums: Dictador 12YO, Dictador 20YO, Dictador XO Perpetual and Dictador XO Insolent. 

In 2018, with its introduction of Dictador 2 Masters, Dictador entered luxury rum category with products aimed at fine spirit conosseurs, collectors and investors. Dictador 2 Masters is a unique collection of rums that have each been created by two masters excelling in the art of wines, spirits, champagnes, armagnacs, and cognac.  Dictador 2 Masters creates a new and unique category of fine Rum, elevating them to a luxury collectors status. 

The collaborations to date include Glenfarclas Whisky, Hardy Cognac, Leclerc Briant Champagne, Barton Bourbon, Laballe Armagnac, Château d'Arche Sauternes and Vignobles Despagne.

Recognition

Dictador rum production is personally supervised by Hernan Arango Parra, a descendant of the famous Don Julio Arango y Parra.
Hernan Parra is a representative of the third generation of the family creating sophisticated Colombian rum. The master oversees the entire production process of the drink according to unique, family recipes, perfected for three generations.

Hernan Parra enjoys great recognition in the world of master blenders brown spirits, and his rums have been awarded many times in international competitions including gold medal at the World Spirit Awards, San Francisco World Spirit Competition, Miami Rum Festival, Tokyo Whiskey and Spirits Competition and many others.

References

External links 
 Dictador website

Colombian brands
Distilled drinks
Rums